The Marion Moguls were a professional baseball team that played in the Interstate Association and Ohio–Pennsylvania League in 1906, and according to Baseball Reference,  1907. The team was based in the United States city of Marion, Ohio and was managed by Clarence Jessup and Ferdinand Drumm.

Numerous major league players spent time with the team, including Donie Bush, Lew Groh, Scotty Ingerton, Dutch Rudolph, Joe Stewart, Sandy Burk, Jake Daubert, Delos Drake, Charlie Luskey and Hughie Tate.

References

Baseball teams established in 1906
Defunct minor league baseball teams
1906 establishments in Ohio
Defunct baseball teams in Ohio
Baseball teams disestablished in 1907
Ohio-Pennsylvania League teams